Bruce William Hall (born May 3, 1953) is an American musician, best known for his work as the bass guitarist, backing and lead vocalist for the rock band REO Speedwagon. He joined the band in 1977, performing on the album, You Can Tune a Piano but You Can't Tuna Fish released the following year. He replaced Gregg Philbin. Of the five members that constituted the band upon his joining (and who were the only members until 1988), he, Kevin Cronin, and Neal Doughty still remain as of summer of 2022, each having continuously remained as main players.

Hall wrote and sang lead on a few of the band's songs, including "Back on the Road Again", "Girl With the Heart of Gold" (Hall sings the verse; frontman Kevin Cronin sings the refrain), "Let's Be-Bop", "Someone Tonight", "Hey, Wait a Minute", "After Tonight", and "Born to Love You". He also co-wrote "Thru the Window" and "Accidents Can Happen" with his brother, Jeffery B. Hall and the Christmas carol "I Believe in Santa Claus" with Cronin. He collaborated with other members of REO Speedwagon in composing several other songs, including the title track of the 1974 album Lost in a Dream with then-lead singer Mike Murphy before he joined the band.

References

External links 
Speedwagon.com FAQ – Where band members live

American rock bass guitarists
REO Speedwagon members
1953 births
Living people
Musicians from Champaign, Illinois
Guitarists from Illinois
American male bass guitarists
20th-century American bass guitarists
20th-century American male musicians